The 2017–18 Scottish League One (known as Ladbrokes League One for sponsorship reasons) was the 23rd season in the format of 10 teams in the third-tier of Scottish football. The fixtures were published on 23 June 2017.

Ten teams contested the league: Airdrieonians, Albion Rovers, Alloa Athletic, Arbroath, Ayr United, East Fife, Forfar Athletic, Queen's Park, Raith Rovers and Stranraer.

Prize money
In April 2018, the SPFL confirmed the prize money to be allocated to the league members at the conclusion of the competitions. The League One winners would receive £119,000 with a total pot of £24.5 million to be distributed across the four divisions.

Teams
The following teams changed division prior to the 2016–17 season.

To League One

Promoted from Scottish League Two
 Arbroath
 Forfar Athletic

Relegated from Scottish Championship
 Ayr United
 Raith Rovers

From League One

Relegated to Scottish League Two
 Peterhead
 Stenhousemuir

Promoted to Scottish Championship
 Brechin City
 Livingston

Stadia and locations

Personnel and kits

Managerial changes

League Summary

League table

Positions by Round
The table lists the positions of teams after each week of matches. In order to preserve chronological progress, any postponed matches are not included in the round at which they were originally scheduled, but added to the full round they were played immediately afterwards. For example, if a match is scheduled for matchday 13, but then postponed and played between days 16 and 17, it will be added to the standings for day 16.

Source:
Updated: 28 April 2018

Results
Teams play each other four times, twice in the first half of the season (home and away) and twice in the second half of the season (home and away), making a total of 36 games.

First half of season

Second half of season

Season statistics

Scoring

Top scorers

Hat-tricks

Discipline

Player

Yellow cards

Red cards

Club

Yellow cards

Red cards

Attendances

Awards

Monthly awards

League One play-offs
The second bottom team entered into a 4-team playoff with the 2nd, 3rd, and 4th placed teams in League Two.

Semi-finals

First leg

Second leg

Final

First leg

Second leg

References

Scottish League One seasons
3
3
Scotland